Teatro de la Luna is an Arlington County, Virginia Theater founded in 1991 that aims to preserve Hispanic heritage. It houses events including: the International Festivals of Hispanic Theater, Latino film festivals and Immigration films festivals.

Budget 

Teatro de la Luna is supported by the Arlington Cultural Affairs Division of Arlington Economic Development and the Arlington Commission for the Arts.

See also 
 GALA Hispanic Theatre
 Office of Latino Affairs of the District of Columbia
 Latin American culture
 Hispanics in Washington, D.C.
 Columbia Heights (Washington, D.C.)
 Theatre in Washington, D.C.

References

External links
 Teatro De La Luna (official site)
 Teatro De La Luna (Twitter)
 Teatro De La Luna (Facebook)

Theatres in Washington, D.C.
Latin American culture
Latin American studies